Abram Moiseevich Ginzburg (1878-1937) was a Russian revolutionary and economist.  He was a defendant at the 1931 Menshevik Trial.

Ginzburg was born in Ilyino in Zapadnodvinsky District and died in Chelyabinsk.

References

1878 births
1937 deaths
People from Tver Oblast
People from Velizhsky Uyezd
Russian Jews
Russian Social Democratic Labour Party members
Mensheviks
Jewish socialists
Soviet economists
1931 Menshevik Trial
Revolutionaries from the Russian Empire